Luis Richard Zambrano Chávez (born 20 May 1967), known as just Richard Zambrano, is a Chilean former footballer.

Career
Zambrano had successful spells in his country and Mexico and retired in 2006, aged 39. His last club was Arturo Fernández Vial, the club where he debuted as a professional after a period of play for Deportes Laja in the mid-1980s. He also played in Venezuela for Deportivo Italchacao in 2001.

Zambrano also represented the Chile national football team in the 1993 Copa América in Ecuador, where he scored twice in a 3–2 victory over Brazil.

Honours

Club
Colo-Colo
 Primera División de Chile (2): 1997 Clausura, 1998

References

External links
 
 

1967 births
Living people
People from Bío Bío Province
Chilean footballers
Chile international footballers
Chilean expatriate footballers
C.D. Arturo Fernández Vial footballers
Unión Española footballers
FC St. Gallen players
Universidad de Chile footballers
Santos Laguna footballers
Deportivo Cali footballers
Atlético Celaya footballers
Colo-Colo footballers
Club Universidad Nacional footballers
Audax Italiano footballers
Deportivo Miranda F.C. players
Puerto Montt footballers
Coquimbo Unido footballers
Primera B de Chile players
Chilean Primera División players
Swiss Super League players
Categoría Primera A players
Liga MX players
Venezuelan Primera División players
Chilean expatriate sportspeople in Switzerland
Chilean expatriate sportspeople in Colombia
Chilean expatriate sportspeople in Mexico
Chilean expatriate sportspeople in Venezuela
Expatriate footballers in Switzerland
Expatriate footballers in Colombia
Expatriate footballers in Mexico
Expatriate footballers in Venezuela
1993 Copa América players
Association football forwards